Hermann Adler HaKohen CVO (30 May 1839 – 18 July 1911;
Hebrew נפתלי צבי הירש הכהן אדלר
) was the Chief Rabbi of the British Empire from 1891 to 1911. The son (and successor as Chief Rabbi) of Nathan Marcus Adler, the 1911 Encyclopædia Britannica writes that he "raised the position [of Chief Rabbi] to one of much dignity and importance."

Biography
Naftali (Hermann) Adler was born in Hanover. Like his father, he had both a rabbinical education and a university education in Germany, and like him he subscribed to a modernised orthodoxy. He attended University College School in London from 1852 to 1854 and rabbinical college in Prague.  He graduated from Leipzig in 1862 with a PhD. He received his semikha (Rabbinic ordination) from Rabbi Solomon Judah Loeb Rapoport. He later received honorary degrees from Scottish and English universities, including Oxford.

Rabbinic career
He was head of the congregation of Bayswater Synagogue, Paddington, during his father's lifetime, and his father's assistant from the time his father's health began to deteriorate in 1879, before succeeding him on his death in 1891.

In 1909 he was appointed a Commander of the Royal Victorian Order (CVO).

Once he was having a lunch with British Catholic cardinal Herbert Vaughan. The cardinal asked the rabbi "Now, Dr. Adler, when may I have the pleasure of helping you to some ham?" The rabbi responded: "At Your Eminence's wedding".
 
Adler wrote extensively on topics of Anglo-Jewish history and published two volumes of sermons. He was a vigorous defender of his co-religionists and their faith, as well as their sacred scriptures.

He is buried in the Willesden United Synagogue Cemetery in London.

See also
 List of British Jews

References

External links
 
 Hermann Adler: Chief Rabbi
 Articles on the British Chief Rabbinate
 Entry on Hermann Adler in Cassell's Universal Portrait Gallery (1895)

1839 births
1911 deaths
Chief rabbis of the United Kingdom
Commanders of the Royal Victorian Order
19th-century English rabbis
20th-century English rabbis
People educated at University College School
Clergy from Hanover
German emigrants to England
British Orthodox rabbis
German Orthodox rabbis
Burials at Willesden Jewish Cemetery